Homestake may refer to:
 Homestake experiment, an experiment headed by astrophysicists Raymond Davis, Jr. and John N. Bahcall in the late 1960s
 Homestake Pass, a mountain pass in the Rocky Mountains of Montana in the United States
 Homestake Mining Company, one of the largest gold mining businesses in the United States from the 19th century through the beginning of the 21st
 Homestake Mine (disambiguation), the name for several mines in the United States
 Homestake, a formation on Mars analyzed by Opportunity rover, which was concluded to be formed of gypsum